Joaquín Moreno Garduño (born May 22, 1973, in Mexico City), known as Joaquín Moreno, is a Mexican football manager and former player currently interim head coach for Liga MX club Cruz Azul.

Honours
Cruz Azul
Mexican Primera División: Invierno 1997
Copa México: 1996–97
CONCACAF Champions' Cup: 1996, 1997

External links
 

1973 births
Living people
Footballers from Mexico City
Mexican football managers
Liga MX players
Mexican footballers
Association football midfielders
Cruz Azul footballers
Club Puebla players
Querétaro F.C. footballers
Cruz Azul non-playing staff